Hugo Eric Flores Cervantes is a Mexican politician and founder of the Social Encounter Party (PES). He was the party's national president and one of its eight federal deputies in the LXIII Legislature of the Mexican Congress. He currently is president of the party’s successor, the Solidarity Encounter Party.

Early life
Flores obtained a law degree from National Autonomous University of Mexico in 1992 and two degrees from Harvard University: a master's degree in public, economic and gubernatorial law in 1996, as well as a J.D. in 2001. In addition to becoming a partner at the law firm of Durán, Flores and Soria, he was the pastor of Casa sobre la Roca (House on the Rock), a Neo-Pentecostal church which supported Felipe Calderón in the 2006 presidential elections.

Social Encounter
In 2006, Social Encounter was founded as a national political group, which unlike a party, is not federally funded; it also organized as a party in Baja California. That same year, after Calderón's election, he obtained a civil service position in the Secretariat of Environment and Natural Resources (SEMARNAT). After six months in the post, he was accused by the secretariat's internal oversight agency for disobeying orders from the secretary and altering a document, prompting his removal and barring him from a public service position until 2020. Additionally, for the LX and LXI Legislatures, Flores was an unused alternate senator for the National Action Party; he had previously been an alternate federal deputy for the Institutional Revolutionary Party.

In 2014, concurrent with Social Encounter's transition to a national political party, Flores was named President of the National Directive Committee of the party, its highest position.

Federal deputy
The PES placed Flores Cervantes at the top of its list of candidates for proportional representation seats in the Chamber of Deputies from the fourth electoral region (representing Mexico City), guaranteeing him a seat in the Chamber of Deputies for the LXIII Legislature of the Mexican Congress. He sits on the Social Development, Finances and Public Credit, and Constitutional Points Commissions, as well as the Committee for the Center for the Study of Public Finances. Additionally, he has been designated a PES representative in various capacities, including before the National Electoral Institute and as one of the fourteen designees of the Chamber of Deputies to the Constituent Assembly of Mexico City.

In June 2020 Flores Cervantes denied allegations of links to organized crime.

References

Harvard Law School alumni
21st-century Mexican politicians
Members of the Constituent Assembly of Mexico City
National Autonomous University of Mexico alumni
Mexican Pentecostal pastors
Deputies of the LXIII Legislature of Mexico
Living people
Year of birth missing (living people)
Members of the Chamber of Deputies (Mexico) for Mexico City